Celaenorrhinus patula, the large spotted flat, is a species of butterfly in the family Hesperiidae. It is found in western China (Guangxi, Mêdog County, Zayü County), Nepal, from north-eastern India to Burma, in northern Thailand and Laos.

patula
Butterflies of Asia
Butterflies of Indochina